The 1955 San Jose State Spartans football team represented San Jose State College during the 1955 college football season.

San Jose State played as an Independent in 1955. The team was led by sixth-year head coach Bob Bronzan, and played home games at Spartan Stadium in San Jose, California. They finished the season with a record of five wins, three losses and one tie (5–3–1). Overall, the team outscored its opponents 159–114 for the season.

Schedule

Team players in the NFL
The following San Jose State players were selected in the 1956 NFL Draft.

Notes

References

San Jose State
San Jose State Spartans football seasons
San Jose State Spartans football